Often a partial differential equation can be reduced to a simpler form with a known solution by a suitable change of variables.

The article discusses change of variable for PDEs below in two ways:
by example;
by giving the theory of the method.

Explanation by example

For example, the following simplified form of the Black–Scholes PDE

is reducible to the heat equation

by the change of variables:

in these steps:

Advice on the application of change of variable to PDEs is given by mathematician J. Michael Steele:

Technique in general

Suppose that we have a function  and a change of variables  such that there exist functions  such that

and functions  such that

and furthermore such that

and

In other words, it is helpful for there to be a bijection between the old set of variables and the new one, or else one has to
 Restrict the domain of applicability of the correspondence to a subject of the real plane which is sufficient for a solution of the practical problem at hand (where again it needs to be a bijection), and
 Enumerate the (zero or more finite list) of exceptions (poles) where the otherwise-bijection fails (and say why these exceptions don't restrict the applicability of the solution of the reduced equation to the original equation)

If a bijection does not exist then the solution to the reduced-form equation will not in general be a solution of the original equation.

We are discussing change of variable for PDEs.  A PDE can be expressed as a differential operator applied to a function.  Suppose  is a differential operator such that

Then it is also the case that

where

In the context of PDEs, Weizhang Huang and Robert D. Russell define and explain the different possible time-dependent transformations in details.

Action-angle coordinates

Often, theory can establish the existence of a change of variables, although the formula itself cannot be explicitly stated. The variables  are the action coordinates, the variables  are the angle coordinates. The motion of the system can thus be visualized as rotation on torii. See V. I. Arnold, `Mathematical Methods of Classical Mechanics', for more details.

References

Multivariable calculus